The 2019–20 season is Rosario Central's 8th consecutive season in the top division of Argentine football. In addition to the Primera División, the club are competing in the Copa Argentina and Copa de la Superliga.

The season generally covers the period from 1 July 2019 to 30 June 2020.

Review

Pre-season
Rosario Central's first incoming was Josué Ayala, who came permanently from Temperley. On 11 June 2019, Rosario Central announced the signing of Ciro Rius; the right winger, who joined from Defensa y Justicia, would make his unofficial debut four days later as the club played their first friendly. Argentino visited the Estadio Gigante de Arroyito on 15 June, and were subsequently dispatched 2–0. 19 June saw Washington Camacho leave for Tijuana. A deal with Unión Santa Fe was reached, subject to personal terms and medicals, on 20 June for the transfers of Emanuel Brítez and Diego Zabala. They were completed a day later. Their next match was played on 22 June, as they beat Sportivo Las Parejas with Claudio Riaño, Fabián Rinaudo, Facundo Almada and Ortigoza goals.

Left-back Gonzalo Bettini was signed by Huracán on 27 June. Ciro Rius scored for them for the first time on 29 June, netting in a friendly victory over their reserves. Numerous loans from the previous campaign officially expired on and around 30 June. Marcos Martinich left for Temperley on 1 July. Luciano Recalde headed off to Platense on 5 July. Diego Novaretti arrived from Querétaro on 5 July, penning a two-year contract. Nicolás Giménez was transferred to San Martín on 5 July. Rosario lost on penalties in an exhibition match at the Estadio Manuel Ferreira against Olimpia on 6 July. They met Rosario-based Central Córdoba in a friendly on 10 July, winning 2–1 at the Estadio Arroyo Seco. Sebastián Ribas moved in on loan from Lanús on 11 July.

Primera B Nacional's Temperley captured centre-back Fernando Alarcón on 12 July. They played out consecutive goalless draws with Unión Santa Fe on 13 July on home soil. Marco Torsiglieri departed to Gimnasia y Esgrima on 16 July, while Duván Vergara penned loan terms with homeland club América de Cali on loan. A Maximiliano Lovera penalty helped Rosario defeat Fénix in a 17 July pre-season friendly. Rosario failed to gain a win on 20 July in exhibition games with Arsenal de Sarandí. Agustín Coscia, the top goalscorer in their reserves, was loaned to Almagro on 24 July. Matías Palavecino switched Argentina for Cyprus on 26 July, as ASIL of the Second Division revealed his arrival. Facundo Rizzi went to Villa Dálmine on 27 July.

July
Rosario Central began their league campaign with a victory on the road against Atlético Tucumán on 29 July, with new signing Ciro Rius netting alongside Leonardo Gil. Also on that date, Hernán Da Campo was loaned to Chacarita Juniors. Nicolás Colazo, from Boca Juniors, became Diego Cocca's sixth new signing on 30 July.

August
On 1 August, Rosario announced the arrival of Lucas Gamba from Huracán on a three-year contract. Soon after, Alfonso Parot's departure to Universidad Católica was confirmed. A goal versus Talleres from off-season signing Diego Zabala secured Rosario two wins from two in the Primera División on 3 August. Rosario shared victories with Sarmiento in exhibition fixtures on 6 August. Rosario met Argentino in friendly action again on 9 August, as they beat them by scoring twice, as they did on 15 June, in both games. Andrés Lioi headed to Poland on loan with Korona Kielce of the Ekstraklasa on 13 August. San Lorenzo and Rosario Central cancelled each other out on 17 August, as Rosario threw away a two-goal advantage to draw 2–2 which ended winning starts for both.

Rosario made it four undefeated in the league on 24 August, after drawing at home to Patronato; Maximiliano Lovera scored for them. On 31 August, Lovera was sold to Olympiacos.

September
Rosario experienced their third tie in a row on 1 September after a 1–1 scoreline with Colón, though the result did extend their unbeaten streak to five matches.

Squad

Transfers
Domestic transfer windows:3 July 2019 to 24 September 201920 January 2020 to 19 February 2020.

Transfers in

Transfers out

Loans in

Loans out

Friendlies

Pre-season
Rosario Central's first pre-season fixture was revealed on 12 June 2019 against city rivals Argentino, set for 15 June, which was followed by the announcement of friendlies in Asunción, Paraguay with Paraguayan Primera División side Olimpia, set for 6 July, and Sol De Mayo; though the latter was later cancelled. On 14 June, Unión Santa Fe scheduled a match with Rosario Central for 13 July. On 21 June, the club announced a behind-closed-doors friendly with Sportivo Las Parejas was set for the following day. They met their reserves on 29 June. A game for 10 July in Arroyo Seco versus Central Córdoba (R) was scheduled. They were set to also face Talleres, but that fixture was later cancelled. Fénix and Arsenal de Sarandí games were added on 16 July.

Mid-season
Rosario met Sarmiento on 6 August in Arroyo Seco. They'd play Argentino on 9 August, just less than two months since their previously meeting on 15 June.

Competitions

Primera División

League table

Relegation table

Source: AFA

Results summary

Matches
The fixtures for the 2019–20 campaign were released on 10 July.

Copa Argentina

Copa de la Superliga

Squad statistics

Appearances and goals

Statistics accurate as of 1 September 2019.

Goalscorers

Notes

References

Rosario Central seasons
Rosario Central